The City of Federal Heights is a home rule municipality located in western Adams County, Colorado, United States. The city population was 14,382 at the 2020 United States Census, a +25.42% increase since the 2010 United States Census. Federal Heights is a part of the Denver–Aurora–Lakewood, CO Metropolitan Statistical Area and the Front Range Urban Corridor. The current Mayor is Linda S. Montoya, who was elected to a four-year term in 2019.

History
The community was named for its location on Federal Boulevard and was officially incorporated in 1940.

Geography
Federal Heights is located at  (39.866085, −105.014160).

At the 2020 United States Census, the town had a total area of  including  of water.

Demographics

At the 2000 census there were 12,065 people, 5,125 households, and 3,023 families living in the city. The racial makeup of the city was 80.03% White, 1.46% African American, 1.38% Native American, 6.09% Asian, 0.18% Pacific Islander, 7.80% from other races, and 3.06% from two or more races. Hispanic or Latino of any race were 22.62%.

Of the 5,125 households, 28.7% had children under the age of 18 living with them, 39.7% were married couples living together, 13.8% had a female householder with no husband present, and 41.0% were non-families. 31.4% of households were one person and 9.9% were one person aged 65 or older. The average household size was 2.35 and the average family size was 2.97.

The age distribution was 24.9% under the age of 18, 12.8% from 18 to 24, 31.6% from 25 to 44, 18.2% from 45 to 64, and 12.5% 65 or older. The median age was 31 years. For every 100 females, there were 95.0 males. For every 100 females age 18 and over, there were 91.4 males.

The median household income was $33,750 and the median family income was $38,468. Males had a median income of $31,054 versus $25,195 for females. The per capita income for the city was $16,801. About 9.2% of families and 11.2% of the population were below the poverty line, including 16.5% of those under age 18 and 3.7% of those age 65 or over.

Attractions
Federal Heights is the home of a major family water park named Water World.

See also

Colorado
Bibliography of Colorado
Index of Colorado-related articles
Outline of Colorado
List of counties in Colorado
List of municipalities in Colorado
List of places in Colorado
List of statistical areas in Colorado
Front Range Urban Corridor
North Central Colorado Urban Area
Denver-Aurora, CO Combined Statistical Area
Denver-Aurora-Lakewood, CO Metropolitan Statistical Area

References

External links
City of Federal Heights website
CDOT map of the City of Federal Heights

Cities in Adams County, Colorado
Cities in Colorado
Denver metropolitan area